The Sanyo Micro Pack 35 was a portable magnetic audio tape recording device, developed by Sanyo in 1964, that employed a special tape cartridge format with tape reels atop each other.

The unit was rebadged and sold as the Channel Master 6546 and the Westinghouse H29R1.

Device 
Offered as a small "sound camera" type reel-to-reel audio tape recorder, the Sanyo Micro Pack 35 used a unique tape cartridge. The Sanyo Micro Pack 35 case and controls were designed to resemble a film camera. The unit was marketed for "capturing the first words of the child, terrorizing party guests and sending voice letters".

The compact styled device used a simplified drive mechanism for tape transport. There was no capstan. Instead, the motor driveshaft protruded into the cartridge between the tape reels pressing against a rubber coating. The whole motor tilted back and forth to press on one reel or the other which determined the tape direction. The changing amount of tape on the engaged reel caused a changing speed of tape transport and up to 1% wow and flutter.  A control on top of the unit allowed the tape speed to be varied between Slow (low quality/long recording time) and Fast (better quality/short recording time).  

The unit featured an input jack for a microphone, an output jack for an earphone and an internal speaker. The VU meter for monitoring the audio level on recording was used as also used in playback mode as a charge level indicator of the four AA batteries.

Cartridge 
The recording cartridges were made of transparent plastic and measured . 

The Channel Master version of the cartridge was labeled as the "Model 6595" and contained  of tape. The ¼ inch wide magnetic tape was guided in a diagonal at the open upper side of the cartridge on tilted rollers in the upper corners in the cartridge. Inside the machine the drive tape head and erase head were installed in an equivalent tilted angle. The analog mono sound recording was a single track per side of the cartridge. Each end of the tape got a conductive mark to stop tape transport. A push button on top of the player was in installed to override the conductive stripe and allow the cartridge to be played in the opposite direction. In all operating modes the cartridge was held in place by another pin which also disengaged the reel brake.

Market 
The high level of wow and flutter in the tape transport and the low frequency response made the device less useful for music.  The format, which appeared a year after Compact Cassette soon lost market share.

In Popular Media 

An unbranded version of the Sanyo Micro Pack 35 was briefly featured in the 1967-68 series of The Prisoner in the episode "the general".

References

External links 
 Techmoan: Forgotten Format: SANYO Micro-Pack 35 Tape Recorder, YouTube, published on 31 August 2017
 Sanyo Micro-Pack 35 – a picture gallery at vintage-technics.ru (archived on 19 January 2017)

Consumer electronics
Tape recording
Audio storage
Discontinued media formats
Sanyo products